The Salvation Army in Canada (nicknamed "Sally Ann") is the Canadian territory of a Christian church that is known for its charity work, with a motto of Giving Hope Today. The Salvation Army was formed in 1865 in London, England, and it began working in Canada in 1882. Today, it operates in 400 communities across Canada and in Bermuda. The Salvation Army Archives are in Toronto, and the Salvation Army's Training College (formerly in Toronto) is in Winnipeg.

Governance

The Salvation Army in Canada is an administrative unit of The Salvation Army that serves Canada and Bermuda. The territory is divided geographically into divisions – Alberta, Bermuda, British Columbia, Maritime, Newfoundland and Labrador, Ontario Central East, Ontario Great Lakes, Prairie, and Quebec. Each division is headed by a divisional commander, who is responsible to the Territorial Commander. In turn, the Territorial Commander is responsible to International Headquarters (IHQ) in London, England.

The Territorial Commander (TC) and Chief Secretary are appointed by the General. Their role is to oversee and administer the work of The Salvation Army within their territory. They are assisted by various other Secretaries (departmental heads) who are, in turn, responsible for overseeing their various branches of Army activity. 

The Territorial Commander is responsible for the territory's overall operation and mission, and the Chief Secretary is responsible for the territory's administration and daily operations. Senior executive officers are, on the recommendation of the Territorial Commander, also appointed by the General. All other officer appointments within a territory are the responsibility of the Territorial Commander and the Cabinet.

The Salvation Army in Canada is a non-governmental direct provider of social services in the areas of homelessness, poverty and addiction, and a continuing support for programs in developing countries. In addition to mobile programs such as disaster relief, and homeless soup lines, the Salvation Army in Canada currently operates permanent facilities including corps community centers (churches), Social Services Centers, summer camps, Adult Rehabilitation Centers, and thrift stores.

History

En route to England, George Scott Railton stopped at the port of Halifax, Nova Scotia, and held the first Salvation Army meeting in Canada on March 24, 1881. He was so engaged in his sermon that he missed his boat to England. He preached in Halifax for the following week at various Halifax churches, and a year later, the Salvation Army was officially established in Canada.

The Salvation Army began operating in Canada in 1882. Brigadier Gideon Miller (1866-1949), Staff Architect for the Salvation Army in Canada from April 1906 until 1931, designed meeting halls (often called 'citadels'), hospitals and hostels in cities and towns across Canada.

In 1886, only four years after it had come to Canada from England, the Salvation Army built its Territorial Headquarters for Canada and Bermuda. It also housed the Toronto Temple, built in 1886 and demolished in 1954.

Arnold Brown (December 13, 1913 – June 26, 2002), the 11th General of The Salvation Army (1977–1981), served as Territorial Commander in 1974. Brown compiled a history of the first 50 years of Salvation Army ministry in Canada, entitled What Hath God Wrought?.

Staff band
 
 
Like other Salvation Army brass bands, the Canadian (Canada and Bermuda) staff band, which is sponsored by a territorial headquarters, travels and records on a regular basis.

Canadian members
 Evangeline Booth served as the Territorial Commander of Canada from 1901 to 1904
 Clarence Wiseman (June 19, 1907 – May 4, 1985) was the 10th General of The Salvation Army from 1974 to 1977
 Arnold Brown (December 13, 1913 – June 26, 2002) was the 11th General of The Salvation Army from 1977 to 1981
 Danielle Strickland co-founded The War College in 2003 in Vancouver, British Columbia

Salvation Army buildings

Alberta
 Salvation Army Citadel in Calgary, Alberta, 1st Street East near 7th Avenue, c. 1920

British Columbia
 Salvation Army in Kelowna 
 Cascade Community Church in Abbotsford
 The Center of Hope in Abbotsford
 Chilliwack Community Church in Chilliwack
 Addictions and Rehabilitation Centre in Victoria
 Sunset Lodge in Victoria
 High Point Community Church in Victoria
 Connections Point Church and Resource Centre in Langford 
 Belkin House in Vancouver
 Harbour Light in Vancouver
 Grace Mansion in Vancouver
 New Westminster Citadel in New Westminster

Maritime
 Maternity Hospital for the Salvation Army, Halifax, Nova Scotia, 1919

Newfoundland and Labrador

Ontario Central East

 The Salvation Army Church in Oshawa 570 Thornton Road N Oshawa Ontario. 
 Salvation Army Citadels in Ottawa, Ontario: Slater Street near Bank Street, 1904 
 Maternity Hospital for the Salvation Army, in Ottawa, Ontario 1920 
 Salvation Army Citadel, Kingston, Ontario, Princess Street, c. 1920 
 Salvation Army Citadels in Toronto, Ontario: Davenport Road, 1907  Dovercourt Road, 1910; Lisgar Street, 1911; Parliament Street at Coatsworth Street, 1912; Dufferin Street near St. Clair Avenue West, 1921 
 Salvation Army Men's Hostel, Victoria Street at Dundas Street East, Toronto, Ontario 1909 
 lodging house for the Salvation Army, Queen Street East, Toronto, Ontario 1913 
 Booth Memorial Training College & Home, Davisville Avenue, Toronto, Ontario 1915

Ontario Great Lakes
 Salvation Army Citadel in Stratford, Ontario, 1912 
 Salvation Army Citadel in London, Ontario 1916-17 
 Bethesda Maternity Hospital, Riverview Avenue, London, Ontario c. 1920 
 Salvation Army Citadel, St. Catharines, Ontario, Geneva Street, c. 1920 
 Grace Hospital for the Salvation Army, London Avenue West at Crawford Avenue, Windsor, Ontario c. 1920 
 Salvation Army Citadel, Welland, Ontario, Cross Street at Division Street, c. 1920 
 Salvation Army Citadel, Sudbury, Ontario, Larch Street, c. 1920 
 Salvation Army Citadel, Sault Ste Marie, Ontario, Spring Street at Queen Street East, c. 1920
 Salvation Army Citadel, Woodstock, Ontario

Prairie
 
 Salvation Army Citadel Corps, Brandon, Manitoba, 1887 
 Salvation Army Grace Hospital, Winnipeg, Manitoba 1909 
 Salvation Army Sunset Lodge, Main Street, Winnipeg, Manitoba  1911
 Salvation Army Citadel, Winnipeg, Manitoba  1912 
 Salvation Army Temple, Saskatoon, Saskatchewan, 20th Street, 1912. Main Street, Current. 
 Salvation Army Citadel, Moosejaw, Saskatchewan, High Street East, c. 1920

Quebec
 Salvation Army Citadels in Montreal, Quebec: St. Alexander Street, 1908; De Montigny Street, 1908; Bourgeois Street, 1908; Adam Street, 1928  
 Booth Memorial Hospital, Outremont Avenue, Montreal, Quebec 1913 
 Salvation Army Citadel, Quebec, Quebec, 1908

See also
Chief of the Staff of The Salvation Army
Generals of The Salvation Army
High Council of The Salvation Army
Officer of The Salvation Army
The Salvation Army
Soldier of The Salvation Army

References

 Brown, Arnold What Hath God Wrought?: a history of the first 50 years of Salvation Army ministry in Canada. Toronto, Ontario, 1997
 Eason, Andrew M. Women in God's Army: Gender and Equality in the Early Salvation Army. Waterloo, Ontario, Canada: Wilfrid Laurier University Press, 2003.  
 Moyles, R. G. Blood And Fire in Canada: A History of the Salvation Army in the Dominion 1882-1976 (Ottawa, Ontario) Call Number  Peake 361.M.11.0

External links

The Salvation Army in Canada
 The Salvation Army: A Presentation by the Canadian War Museum
 Statistical Profile of Salvation Army in the USA and Canada at the Association of Religion Data Archives

Canada
Holiness organizations established in the 20th century
Charities based in Canada
Social welfare charities
Christian organizations based in Canada
Christian denominations in Bermuda
Religious organizations established in 1882
The Salvation Army
Salvationism in Canada
Evangelical denominations in North America